Derik is a town in the Derik District in Mardin Province of Turkey. The town had a population of 18,942 in 2021.

Government
In the local elections of April 10 Mülkiye Esmez from the Peoples' Democratic Party was elected mayor. But on 15 November 2019 she was detained and a day later dismissed from her post as mayor and the District Governor Hakan Kafkas was appointed as trustee instead.

History
The town is first mentioned in the late 14th century, however a Roman fort indicates that the area has been inhabited for longer. Prior to the Assyrian and Armenian genocide, Assyrians and Armenians formed the majority in the district. The Armenian population of the county continued to form the majority even up until the 1930s, when systematic state persecution forced many to emigrate. One family continues to live here, and they maintain the old Armenian Church. The Armenian Apostolic Church in Derik is only one out of six in Anatolian Turkey that operates as a church.

Geography
Geographically the town includes areas from Mazıdağı foot descending towards Ceylanpınar plains. Town area descends from the north to the south. The city center is surrounded by mountains from 3 sides and has a temperate climate with some mediterranean climate effects.

Notable Native 

 Qedrîcan (1911-1972), Kurdish poet, writer and translator
 Bülent Tekin (*1952), Kurdish poet and writer
Enwer Karahan (*1962), Kurdish writer
 Leyla Birlik (*1972), Kurdish politician
 Civar Çetin (*1992), footballer

References

External links
 http://www.derik.bel.tr 

Populated places in Mardin Province
Assyrian communities in Turkey
Kurdish settlements in Mardin Province